Air Hostess: Sapno Ka Aasmaan is a Hindi TV series which was aired on DD National from 2007-2008. It featured Seema Malik in the lead role of Mansi, a simple girl from a middle-class family with dreams to reach the sky. Shalin Bhanot played the male lead Aryan, while Seema Kapoor played the antagonist Miss. Khambatta.

Cast
 Seema Malik as Mansi
 Shalin Bhanot as Capt. Aryan Khambatta 
 Seema Kapoor as Miss Khambatta, Airport Manager and Aryan's elder sister
 Aanjjan Srivastav as Ramakant, Mansi's father
 Shielly Shukla as Shanti, Mansi's mother
 Tia Gandwani as Sania Malhotra, an airhostess and Aryan's former fiancée
 Ajay Kumar Sinha
 Neetu Singh
 Mitali Nikam
 Narendra Soni
 Rim Khan
 Dinesh Ojha

References

External links
https://m.imdb.com/title/tt7295314/

Hindi-language television shows
Aviation television series
1986 Indian television series debuts